Daniel Thomas Eismann (born February 15, 1947) is an American lawyer and retired judge from Idaho. He is a retired justice of the Idaho Supreme Court. Elected to the court in 2000, he was chief justice from 2007 to 2011, and stepped down from the court in 2017.

Born in Eugene, Oregon, while his father attended law school, Eismann was raised in Homedale in Owyhee County, Idaho,  and graduated from Vallivue High School near Caldwell in 1965. He attended the University of Idaho in Moscow for two years where he became a member of the Sigma Alpha Epsilon fraternity, then enlisted in the U.S. Army.

Eismann served two consecutive tours of duty in Vietnam as a crew chief/door gunner on a Huey gunship helicopter, and was awarded two purple hearts for being wounded in combat and three medals for heroism. After an honorable discharge from the military, he returned to UI to complete his undergraduate degree in sociology and then graduated cum laude from its College of Law in 1976.

Eismann went into private practice in Homedale, and was appointed as a magistrate judge in Owyhee County in 1986 and a district judge in Ada County in 1995.

He unseated supreme court justice Cathy Silak in the statewide election in May 2000, the only defeat  for an incumbent on the court since 1944. Eismann was unopposed for re-election in 2006 and 2012, and retired in August 2017.

Governor Butch Otter appointed Richard Bevan of the fifth district (Twin Falls) to fill the seat, who was unopposed for election

References

External links

Ballotpedia
Salute: A Tribute to Vietnam Veterans: Dan Eismann

|-

1947 births
Living people
United States Army personnel of the Vietnam War
Justices of the Idaho Supreme Court
People from Owyhee County, Idaho
University of Idaho alumni
United States Army soldiers
University of Idaho College of Law alumni
Chief Justices of the Idaho Supreme Court